Catherine Persson (born 1965) is a Swedish Social Democratic politician. She was a member of the Riksdag from 1996 to  2007.

External links
Catherine Persson at the Riksdag website

Members of the Riksdag from the Social Democrats
Living people
1965 births
Women members of the Riksdag
Members of the Riksdag 2002–2006
21st-century Swedish women politicians
Date of birth missing (living people)